This is a list of English football seasons played by Langney Sports (1983 until 2001) and Eastbourne Borough Football Club from 2001 to the present day. Their early years (1964-1983) which were spent playing amateur and intermediate football are not included.

Eastbourne Borough Football Club is an English association football club based in Langney, Eastbourne. The club was founded in 1964 as Langney F.C and joined Division Two of the Eastbourne & District Football League. In 1968, the club changed its name to Langney Sports F.C. which is reflected in the club's nickname "The Sports". They spent their early years playing in the Eastbourne & District Football League and the Eastbourne & Hastings League, before becoming a founding member of the Sussex County League Division Three in 1983. The club moved to Priory Lane in the same year and was renamed Eastbourne Borough F.C. in 2001.

The years 1983-2000 were spent in the County League, before the club climbed the football pyramid under Garry Wilson reaching the Conference National in the space of nine seasons. They were relegated back to the Conference South in 2011. The club has won the Sussex Senior Cup three times, has reached the FA Cup first round on four occasions and the FA Trophy third round on four occasions.

Key

Key to league record
P - games played
W - games won
D - games drawn
L - games lost
F - goals for
A - goals against
Pts - points
Pos - final position

Key to rounds
1QR - first qualifying round
2QR - second qualifying round, etc.
PR - preliminary round
1R - first round
2R - second round, etc.
QF - quarter-final
SF - semi-final

Key to divisions
Conf Nat - Conference
Conf South - Conference South
NLS - National League South
SC1 - Sussex County League Division One
SC2 - Sussex County League Division Two
SC3 - Sussex County League Division Three
SLP - Southern League Premier Division
SLE - Southern League Eastern Division

Key to cups
SSC - Sussex Senior Cup

Sources for League, FA Cup and FA Trophy statistics:

References

Seasons
Eastbourne Borough